The Zimmerman School is a historic school building located at Columbia, South Carolina. It was built in 1848, and is a small Greek Revival style one-story clapboard building with a gable roof. The school was built by Charles and Hannah Zimmerman, who operated it from 1848 to 1870, and also built the neighboring Zimmerman House.

It was added to the National Register of Historic Places in 1979.

References

School buildings on the National Register of Historic Places in South Carolina
Greek Revival architecture in South Carolina
Buildings and structures completed in 1848
Buildings and structures in Columbia, South Carolina
National Register of Historic Places in Columbia, South Carolina